Amanda & Jack Go Glamping is a 2017 American comedy-drama film written and directed by Brandon Dickerson and starring David Arquette, Amy Acker, Adan Canto and June Squibb. Principal photography focused in the areas of Elgin, TX and Austin, TX. The film has been released on November 10, 2017 by Orion Pictures and Gravitas Ventures.

Premise
Jack Spencer (David Arquette) has his marriage and career in trouble, he is a dejected author. He decides to leave his kids with his brother in-law and travel with his wife Amanda to an isolated glamping (glamorous camping) retreat in search of a spark in life.

There is a surprise double booking and he finds their private retreat anything but private. Jack then runs into various comedic scenarios, including a friendship with a miniature donkey.

Cast
 David Arquette as Jack Spencer
 Amy Acker as Amanda
 Adan Canto as Nate
 June Squibb as Jude
 Gustavo Gomez as Jordan

Reception
On review aggregator Rotten Tomatoes, the film has an approval rating of 40% based on 5 reviews, with an average score of 5/10.

References

External links
 

2017 films
Films shot in Texas
2017 comedy-drama films
American comedy-drama films
Films shot in Austin, Texas
2010s English-language films
2010s American films